The Great Synagogue of Rome is the largest synagogue in Rome.

History
The Jewish community of Rome goes back to the 2nd century B.C when the Roman Republic had an alliance of sorts with Judea under the leadership of Judah Maccabeus. At that time, many Jews came to Rome from Judea. Their numbers increased during the following centuries due to the settlement that came with Mediterranean trade. Then large numbers of Jews were brought to Rome as slaves following the Jewish–Roman wars in Judea from 63 to 135 CE.

The present Synagogue was constructed shortly after the unification of Italy in 1870, when the Kingdom of Italy captured Rome and the Papal States ceased to exist. The Roman Ghetto was demolished and the Jews were granted citizenship. The building which had previously housed the ghetto synagogue (a complicated structure housing five scolas (the Italian-Jewish term for synagogues) in a single building was demolished, and the Jewish community began making plans for a new and impressive building.

Commemorative plates have been affixed to honor the local Jewish victims of Nazi Germany and of the Abu Nidal Organization attack in 1982.

On 13 April 1986, Pope John Paul II made an unexpected visit to the Great Synagogue. This event marked the first known visit by a pope to a synagogue since the early history of the Roman Catholic Church. He prayed with Rabbi Elio Toaff, the then Chief Rabbi of Rome. In 2010 Rabbi Riccardo Di Segni hosted a visit from Pope Benedict XVI, while Pope Francis visited the synagogue on 17 January 2016.

The synagogue celebrated its centenary in 2004. In addition to serving as a house of worship, it is also serves a cultural and organizational centre for la Comunità Ebraica di Roma (the Jewish community of Rome). It houses the offices of the Chief Rabbi of Rome, as well as the Jewish Museum of Rome.

On 17 January 2005, thirteen cantors, in conjunction with the Jewish Ministers Cantors Association of America (the Chazzanim Farband), performed in a cantorial concert for the first time in the synagogue's history.

Pope Francis visited the Great Synagogue on 17 January, 2016.  During his visit, the pope denounced all violence committed in the name of God, and joined in the diaspora as a sign of interfaith friendship.  Pope Francis repeated several times the words first spoken by Pope John Paul, saying that Jews were the "elder brothers" of Christians. Pope Francis added Christian "elder sisters" of the Jewish faith to his words.

1982 attack 

The synagogue was attacked on 9 October 1982 by 5 armed Palestinian terrorists at the close of the morning Sabbath service. One person, Stefano Gaj Taché (2 years), was killed.

Design
Designed by Vincenzo Costa and Osvaldo Armanni, the synagogue was built from 1901 to 1904 on the banks of the Tiber, overlooking the former ghetto. It contains elements of Assyrian-Babylonian, Egyptian and Greco-Roman architecture. The eclectic style of the building makes it stand out, even in a city known for notable buildings and structures. This attention-grabbing design was a deliberate choice made by the community at the time who wanted the building to be a visible celebration of their freedom and to be seen from many vantage points in the city. The aluminium dome is the only square dome in the city and makes the building easily identifiable, even from a distance.
The interior of the synagogue is lavishly decorated in the Art Nouveau style.

Gallery

Synagogue building

Jewish Museum

References
“Tempio Maggiore di Roma (The Great Synagogue of Rome)”

Notes

External links

 Museum adjacent to Synagogue

Italki Jews topics
Orthodox synagogues in Italy
Religious buildings and structures in Rome
Rome R. XI Sant'Angelo
Jewish Roman (city) history
Sephardi Jewish culture in Italy
Sephardi synagogues
Synagogues completed in 1904
1904 establishments in Italy
Neoclassical architecture in Italy
Neoclassical synagogues
Beaux-Arts synagogues
Synagogue buildings with domes